Usama Qadri is a Pakistani politician who has been a member of the National Assembly of Pakistan since August 2018.

Political career
He was elected to the National Assembly of Pakistan from Constituency NA-253 (Karachi Central-I) as a candidate of Muttahida Qaumi Movement in 2018 Pakistani general election.

External Link

More Reading
 List of members of the 15th National Assembly of Pakistan
 No-confidence motion against Imran Khan

References

Living people
Pakistani MNAs 2018–2023
Muttahida Qaumi Movement MNAs
Year of birth missing (living people)